Francis Ah Mya was an Anglican priest in the middle third of the  20th century.

He was educated at the Bishop's College in Calcutta and ordained in 1933. He was a tutor at the Divinity School, Rangoon from 1933 to 1940 and then the incumbent at St Matthew Moulmein until his appointment to the episcopate as assistant bishop of Rangoon in 1949. He was consecrated a bishop on Pentecost day (5 June), by George Hubback, Bishop of Calcutta, at St Paul's Cathedral, Calcutta. In 1966 he became its diocesan and in 1970 established a new Anglican Province with himself as Archbishop, resigning in 1972.

During the Second World War he was held as a prisoner of war by the Japanese. It was said that he became the leader of other POWs. He managed to persuade the Commandant to release other prisoners and himself under a plan given to him by God. — This story is told in the book "Going My Way" by Godfrey Winn.

References

20th-century Anglican bishops in Asia
Anglican bishops of Rangoon
20th-century Anglican archbishops